Turi Turini (Aymara turi tower, the reduplication indicates that there is a group of something, -ni a suffix to indicate ownership, "the one with a group of towers", also spelled Tori Torini) is a mountain in the Bolivian Andes which reaches a height of approximately . It is located in the Cochabamba Department, Ayopaya Province, Morochata Municipality, southwest of the village of Chorito.

References 

Mountains of Cochabamba Department